WBCF (1240 kHz, "NewsTalk 1240") is an American AM radio station broadcasting a News Talk Information format. Licensed to serve the community of Florence, Alabama, the station broadcasts to the Florence-Muscle Shoals Metropolitan Area.

History
The station is currently owned by Benny Carle Broadcasting, Inc., and features programming from Westwood One, CBS Radio, and Fox News Radio.

Company namesake Benny Carle was, from the 1950s through the 1970s, a children's show host on Birmingham and Huntsville television stations, the latter of which (the present WAFF-TV) he was a minority owner.

References

External links

Benny Carle-Classic Alabama TV

BCF (AM)
News and talk radio stations in the United States